is a Japanese company, and one of the three major pachinko machine manufacturers in Japan. Headquartered in Shibuya-ku, Tokyo, their corporate slogan is "Good luck, Good life".

It was founded by Kunio Busujima. His son Hideyuki Busujima has been the chairman and CEO since 2008.

References

External links
sankyo-fever.co.jp
Manufacturing companies of Japan
Pachinko
Companies listed on the Tokyo Stock Exchange
Gambling companies of Japan